Oliver Berg (born 28 August 1993) is a Norwegian footballer who plays for Djurgårdens IF in Allsvenskan.

References

1993 births
Living people
Norwegian footballers
Raufoss IL players
Odds BK players
Dalkurd FF players
GIF Sundsvall players
Kalmar FF players
Djurgårdens IF Fotboll players
Eliteserien players
Allsvenskan players
Superettan players
Sportspeople from Gjøvik
Association football midfielders
Norwegian expatriate footballers
Norwegian expatriate sportspeople in Sweden
Expatriate footballers in Sweden